Ray Smith (October 30, 1934 – November 29, 1979) was an American rockabilly musician.

Career
Smith recorded for Vee-Jay Records, Tollie Records, Smash Records, Sun Records and Boot Records during his career, and had a hit with the song "Rockin' Little Angel" in 1960 on Judd Records. "Rockin' Little Angel" took a portion of its melody from the 1844 song "Buffalo Gals". The record sold over one million copies, earning a gold disc. Smith often recorded material written by Charlie Rich, and was influenced by Elvis Presley. Smith gave a concert at "Karregat" Hall in Eindhoven on April 21, 1979. It is recorded on an album called The Rocking Side and released by a Dutch label (Rockhouse, LP 7909).

Death
Smith committed suicide on November 29, 1979, at the age of 45.
Smith's Judd and Sun singles and session material have been released on Germany's Bear Family Records.

References

1934 births
1979 suicides
Vee-Jay Records artists
Sun Records artists
Charly Records artists
Smash Records artists
American rockabilly musicians
American rock musicians
American rock singers
American male singer-songwriters
American bandleaders
Rock musicians from Kentucky
20th-century American singers
Singer-songwriters from Kentucky
Country musicians from Kentucky
20th-century American male singers
Suicides in Ontario